Anton Vladimirovich Kilin (born 14 November 1990) is a Russian professional football player. He plays for FC Akron Tolyatti.

Club career
He made his Russian Premier League debut for FC Ufa on 20 September 2014 in a game against FC Ural Yekaterinburg.

External links
 
 

1990 births
Sportspeople from Izhevsk
20th-century Russian people
21st-century Russian people
Living people
Russian footballers
Association football midfielders
FC Ufa players
FC KAMAZ Naberezhnye Chelny players
FC Luch Vladivostok players
FC Tambov players
FC Akron Tolyatti players
FC Tolyatti players
Russian Premier League players
Russian First League players
Russian Second League players